James Gerard Dunne (born 19 October 1997) is an Irish professional footballer who plays as a centre back for EFL Championship club Queens Park Rangers.

Dunne played locally in Ireland before joining the youth set-up at Manchester United in 2007. After transferring to Burnley in 2016, he spent time on loan at Barrow (where he made his senior debut in August 2017) and Accrington Stanley (where he made his Football League debut in January 2018).

Club career
Born in Dundalk, Dunne began his career with St Kevin's Boys before joining the Manchester United Academy in Belfast at the age of 10.

In July 2016, Dunne signed a two-year contract (with a further year's option in the club's favour) with Burnley. In July 2017, he moved to National League side Barrow on a six-month loan. He made his senior debut on 5 August 2017.

In early January 2018, the club confirmed Dunne's loan would not be extended and he would return to parent club Burnley. Later that month he joined EFL League Two club Accrington Stanley on loan for the remainder of the season. He made his Football League debut on 6 January 2018.

On 21 August 2018, Dunne joined Scottish Premiership side Heart of Midlothian (Hearts) on a 6 month loan deal. His loan ended in January 2019. A few days later he moved on loan to Sunderland. In September 2019 he moved on loan to Fleetwood Town.

On 17 September 2020, Dunne made his senior debut for Burnley in the 2nd round of the EFL Cup, in a 1–1 draw against Sheffield United which Burnley eventually won on penalties. He scored on his Premier League debut on 20 September 2020, in a 4–2 defeat away at Leicester City.

On 13 July 2021, Dunne joined Queens Park Rangers for an undisclosed fee, agreeing a three-year deal.

International career
In March 2018, Dunne received a call-up to the Republic of Ireland under-21 side for the first time, making his debut on 22 March 2018 in a 3–1 friendly win over Iceland, replacing Corey Whelan as a substitute late in the game.

On 6 November 2018, Dunne was named in the provisional senior Republic of Ireland squad for the first time for the friendly match against Northern Ireland on 15 November and the UEFA Nations League match against Denmark on 19 November 2018. He was omitted from the final squad, and was linked with a call-up to the Northern Ireland team, whom he qualifies through the grandparent rule.

He was called-up again by the Republic of Ireland in March 2019.

Career statistics

Honours

Club
Sunderland
EFL Trophy runner-up: 2018–19

References

 

1997 births
Living people
Republic of Ireland association footballers
Republic of Ireland under-21 international footballers
Manchester United F.C. players
Burnley F.C. players
Barrow A.F.C. players
Accrington Stanley F.C. players
Heart of Midlothian F.C. players
Sunderland A.F.C. players
Fleetwood Town F.C. players
National League (English football) players
English Football League players
Scottish Professional Football League players
Association football defenders
Premier League players
St. Kevin's Boys F.C. players
Queens Park Rangers F.C. players